Statistics of the Scottish Football League in season 1947–48.

Scottish League Division A

Scottish League Division B

Scottish League Division C

See also
1947–48 in Scottish football

 
Scottish Football League seasons